St. Alexander's church in Varniai is the oldest church in Samogitia.

History 
Prior to the Medininkai diocese, which eventually became the Samogitian diocese, a parish church was already established in Varniai. At the location, now occupied by St. Alexander’s church, there previously stood another church, built by Vytautas Magnus, which was consecrated in 1417 as  St. Alexander’s church, according to the Christian name of Vytautas Magnus.

From the beginning of the 15th century, the church was rebuilt numerous times, and its present appearance was created in 1779. The building incorporates the characteristics of late Baroque and folk architecture. After WWII,  St. Alexander’s church was closed and damaged by the Soviet government. In 1991, it was restored, and returned to the religious community.

Gallery

References 

Telšiai District Municipality
Roman Catholic churches in Telšiai County
Samogitia